Javier Araújo (born December 26, 1984) is a former Colombian football player who played as a midfielder. He last played for Valledupar.

Career
Araújo began his career in Colombia in 2002 with Once Caldas. In 2004, he was part of the squad that won the Copa Libertadores 2004.

In 2007, Araújo was also selected to play for the Colombia national football team for the first time.

Titles
Once Caldas
 Categoria Primera A: Apertura 2003
Copa Libertadores: 2004

External links

 BDFA profile

1984 births
Living people
Colombian footballers
Colombia international footballers
Colombia under-20 international footballers
Categoría Primera A players
Once Caldas footballers
Deportivo Pasto footballers
Boyacá Chicó F.C. footballers
Millonarios F.C. players
Atlético Huila footballers
La Equidad footballers
Juan Aurich footballers
Cúcuta Deportivo footballers
Uniautónoma F.C. footballers
Peruvian Primera División players
Colombian expatriate footballers
Expatriate footballers in Peru
Association football midfielders
People from Cesar Department